Yoann Décimus (born 30 November 1987 in Paris) is a French sprint athlete.

Achievements

References

1987 births
Living people
French male sprinters
Athletes from Paris